José Luis Rosales (born 1 March 1943) is a Salvadoran former sports shooter. He competed in the 25 metre pistol event at the 1972 Summer Olympics.

References

1943 births
Living people
Salvadoran male sport shooters
Olympic shooters of El Salvador
Shooters at the 1972 Summer Olympics
Place of birth missing (living people)